= CPR Buffalo Yard =

Railway facility in New York

Coordinates: 42°52′48″N 78°49′15″W

CPR Buffalo Yard was a Canadian Pacific Railway facility in Buffalo, New York, United States. It was officially known as "SK yard". The yard was formerly part of the Delaware & Hudson Railroad. In 2004 it closed and was replaced by a joint CPR-Norfolk Southern Railway facility on the east side of Binghamton, New York.

The CPR facility was used by freight trains.
